is the third single by Japanese idol group Hinatazaka46. It was released on October 2, 2019 through Sony Music Entertainment Japan. The title track features Nao Kosaka as lead performer, marking her third consecutive appearance in this position. The single debuted at number one on the Oricon Singles Chart with 476,739 copies sold in its first week.

Release 
The music video for the main song was recorded at the Kobe Kokusai Hall and the Hyōgo Prefecture Guest House (兵庫県公館) in Kobe, Hyōgo Prefecture.

The single was released in four versions: Type-A, Type-B, Type-C and a regular edition. Type-A features the first song by the guitar duo Hana-chans,  Type-B features member Hinano Kamimura's first solo song, 

Aside from the official music video, the group also recorded a long take music video as a segment of their variety show Hinatazaka de Aimashō, which features the members performing various skills such as baton twirling, poi, kendama, and acrobatic jump rope.

Reception 
Real Sound commented that the rock-style dance music of "Ichiban Suki da to Min'na ni Itte ita Shōsetsu no Taitoru o Omoidasenai" was "unexpected from a Sakamichi Series group" and compared Kamimura's "cool and powerful" singing voice to Ami Suzuki.

Track listing 
All lyrics written by Yasushi Akimoto.

Type-A

Type-B

Type-C

Regular Edition

Participating members

"Konna ni Suki ni Natchatte Ii no?" 
Center: Nao Kosaka

 1st row: Kyōko Saitō, Nao Kosaka, Shiho Katō
 2nd row: Mei Higashimura, Konoka Matsuda, Miku Kanemura, Mirei Sasaki, Miho Watanabe, Ayaka Takamoto, 
 3rd row: Kumi Sasaki, Suzuka Tomita, Mao Iguchi, Akari Nibu, Hinano Kamimura, Hina Kawata, Mana Takase, Sarina Ushio, Manamo Miyata

"Honto no Jikan" 
Mao Iguchi, Sarina Ushio, Shiho Katō, Kyōko Saitō, Kumi Sasaki, Mirei Sasaki, Mana Takase, Ayaka Takamoto, Mei Higashimura, Miku Kanemura, Hina Kawata, Nao Kosaka, Suzuka Tomita, Akari Nibu, Konoka Matsuda, Manamo Miyata, Miho Watanabe, Hinano Kamimura

"Masaka Gūzen…" 
Suzuka Tomita, Konoka Matsuda

"Ichiban Sukida to Minna ni Itte ita Shōsetsu no Taitoru o Omoidasenai" 
Hinano Kamimura

"Mama no Dress" 
Sarina Ushio, Shiho Katō, Kyōko Saitō, Kumi Sasaki, Ayaka Takamoto

"Kawa wa Nagareru" 
Mao Iguchi, Sarina Ushio, Shiho Katō, Kyōko Saitō, Kumi Sasaki, Mirei Sasaki, Mana Takase, Ayaka Takamoto, Mei Higashimura, Miku Kanemura, Hina Kawata, Nao Kosaka, Suzuka Tomita, Akari Nibu, Konoka Matsuda, Manamo Miyata, Miho Watanabe, Hinano Kamimura

Charts 

Weekly charts

Year-end charts

Notes

References

External link 

 

2019 singles
2019 songs
Hinatazaka46 songs
Songs with lyrics by Yasushi Akimoto
Sony Music Entertainment Japan singles
Oricon Weekly number-one singles
Billboard Japan Hot 100 number-one singles